Manipuri folktales may refer to:
 Meitei folktales, the folktales of Meitei people, the largest ethnicity of Manipur
 Folktales of other indigenous ethnic groups living in Manipur
 Naga folktales, folktales of the Naga people living in Manipur as well as in other regions
 Mao folktales, folktales of the Mao Naga people, an indigenous ethnic group of Manipur